The 2014 Championship 1, known as the Kingstone Press Championship 1 for sponsorship reasons, was a semi-professional rugby league football competition played in England, the third tier of the sport in the country.

One team will be promoted from Championship 1, due to the restructure of Super League and the Championship, The top five sides will contest the play-offs the winner will be promoted. There is no relegation from this league as it is the lowest tier of professional rugby league.

The only cup competition the teams will compete in is the 2014 Challenge Cup after the Northern Rail Cup was scrapped for 2014.

2014 structure

The competition features the seven teams that did not win promotion at the end of 2012 Championship 1: Gateshead Thunder, Gloucestershire All Golds, Hemel Stags, London Skolars, Oldham, Oxford Rugby League and South Wales Scorpions. The two new teams to the division for 2014 are Hunslet Hawks and York City Knights, who were relegated from the RFL Championship.

Season table

Season results

The regular league season sees the 9 teams play each other twice (one home, one away) over 18 matches. At the end of the season, five teams will contest a playoff for a place in the new Championship structure. Five clubs will be relegated to the Championship 1 from the Championship.

References

External links
Official Championship 1 website
RFL Championship coverage
Scores from Sky Sports
RugbyLeague.org Championship 1 Fans Forums

RFL League 1
Rugby Football League Championship
2014 in English rugby league
2014 in Welsh rugby league